Pachnephorus torridus is a species of leaf beetle found in Senegal, Gambia, Guinea Bissau, Sierra Leone, Mali, Ivory Coast, Burkina, Togo, Niger, Nigeria, Chad, Sudan, Cameroon, the Central African Republic, Ethiopia, Equatorial Guinea,
Gabon, the Republic of the Congo, the Democratic Republic of the Congo, Kenya, Tanzania, Zambia, Malawi,
Namibia, Mozambique and South Africa, described by Joseph Sugar Baly in 1878.

References

Eumolpinae
Beetles of the Democratic Republic of the Congo
Insects of West Africa
Insects of Chad
Insects of Sudan
Insects of Cameroon
Insects of the Central African Republic
Insects of Ethiopia
Insects of Equatorial Guinea
Insects of Gabon
Insects of the Republic of the Congo
Insects of Kenya
Insects of Tanzania
Insects of Zambia
Insects of Malawi
Insects of Namibia
Insects of Mozambique
Insects of South Africa
Beetles described in 1878
Taxa named by Joseph Sugar Baly